The Happy Merchant is a common name for an image that depicts an antisemitic caricature of a Jewish man. The Happy Merchant is common on imageboards such as 4chan where it is frequently used in a hateful or disparaging context.

History 
The image was first created by a cartoonist called A. Wyatt Mann (a play on "A white man") a pseudonym of Nick Bougas. The image was part of a cartoon that also included a racist caricature of a black man and used these images to say: "Let's face it! A world without Jews and Blacks would be like a world without rats and cockroaches." The cartoon was first released in print, but appeared online in February 2001.

The stereotypical image of a Jew in the cartoon was cropped out, and began to spread on various internet communities, where users began to make variations of it.

The Happy Merchant meme endorses the idea that Jews secretly conspire to conquer the world. The meme has taken many forms on the internet and social media platforms, but all with a comedic undertone that expresses the opinions and beliefs of a certain audience.

Description 
The image is intended as a derogatory depiction, and employs many stereotypes of Jews. These include:

 A large, hook-shaped nose ("Jewish nose").
 A yarmulke (Jewish head garment).
 A malevolent smile, with a slightly hunched back and hands being rubbed together, to indicate greed or scheming.
 Balding, tightly curled black hair and a tightly curled black beard.

Use 
This image is a form of antisemitic propaganda, common on alt-right internet communities such as 4chan, other "chan" websites, and on other message boards. In 2017, Al Jazeera tweeted an image that included the Happy Merchant on its official English-language Twitter account. The tweet was promoting a story about climate change, and insinuated that Jewish people were behind climate change. Al Jazeera later deleted the tweet, explaining that it had been used in a segment covering alt-right antisemitic climate change conspiracy theories.

A 2018 study published by Savvas Zannettou et al. focused on online antisemitism recorded that the Happy Merchant and its variations were "among the most popular memes on both 4chan's /pol/ board and Gab, two major outlets for alt-right expression. The study found that usage of the Happy Merchant on /pol/ remained largely consistent (with a peak during the US airstrike on Syria in April 2017), while usage of the meme on Gab increased after the Charlottesville rally in August 2017. It was also determined that /pol/ influences the spread of Happy Merchant to other web platforms such as Twitter and Reddit.

The same study also found that the Happy Merchant has been incorporated into other common memes on the site, including Pepe the Frog.

The video game Ethnic Cleansing featured the image, although it was not yet called the Happy Merchant at that time.

References 

Publications

External links 

Internet memes
Antisemitic works
Alt-right
/pol/ phenomena
Stereotypes of Jewish people
Caricature